Benjamin Albertson Willis (March 24, 1840 – October 14, 1886) was a U.S. Representative from New York.

Biography
Born in Roslyn, New York, the eldest son of Charles Willis and Abigail Albertson, Willis was graduated from Union College in 1861.  He studied law, was admitted to the bar in 1862 and commenced practice in New York City.  During the Civil War, he enlisted in the Union Army in 1862.  He served as captain in the One Hundred and Nineteenth New York Volunteers, and subsequently colonel of the 12th New York Volunteer Infantry.  He was honorably discharged in 1864.  He resumed the practice of law, and was a member of the New York State Assembly 1872-1878.

Willis was elected as a Democrat to the Forty-fourth and Forty-fifth Congresses (March 4, 1875 – March 3, 1879).  He served as chairman of the Committee on Expenditures in the Department of the Navy (Forty-fifth Congress).  He was an unsuccessful candidate for reelection in 1878 to the Forty-sixth Congress.  He engaged in the practice of law and also in the real estate business. He married Lillie Evelyn Macauley, daughter of William Macauley and Mary S. Underhill, and had three children: Kate T. Willis, Portia Willis and Benjamin A. Willis Jr.  He died in New York City on October 14, 1886.  He was interred in Friends Cemetery, Westbury, Long Island.  He was reinterred in Woodlawn Cemetery.

References
 Retrieved on 2008-09-28
 Underhill Genealogy Vol. 5, pg 354 & 500, edited by Edwin Deats and Harry Macy, published 1980.

External links

 
 

1840 births
1886 deaths
Union College (New York) alumni
Democratic Party members of the New York State Assembly
New York (state) lawyers
Union Army colonels
Politicians from New York City
People of New York (state) in the American Civil War
People from Roslyn, New York
Democratic Party members of the United States House of Representatives from New York (state)
19th-century American politicians
19th-century American lawyers